Lars Schänzler (born 24 August 1995) is a badminton player from Germany.

Career 
Schänzler started playing badminton at the aged of eight. In 2013, he became the boys' singles runner-up at the U-19 German Championships. At the same year, he competed at the European Junior Championships reaching the quarter finals. Together with the national team, he won the bronze medals at the 2014, 2016, 2018 European Men's Team Championships and at the 2017 European Mixed Team Championships.

Achievements

BWF International Challenge/Series 
Men's singles

  BWF International Challenge tournament
  BWF International Series tournament
  BWF Future Series tournament

References

External links 
 

Living people
1995 births
German male badminton players